U.S. Highway 51 (US 51) in the U.S. state of Wisconsin runs north–south through the central part of the state. It enters from Illinois at Beloit, and runs north to its northern terminus in Hurley where it meets US 2. Much of the route of US 51 runs concurrently with Interstate 39 (I-39).

Route description

From Beloit, US 51 passes through Janesville and Edgerton. US 51 joins with I-39 and I-90 for about  before splitting off and heading west to Stoughton. US 51 then passes through the east side of Madison as a side route, known locally as Stoughton Road, paralleling to the west of I-39/I-90. North of Madison, US 51 parallels the Interstates on the east side passing through De Forest, Leeds, North Leeds, Poynette and Portage. In North Leeds, US 51 has a major junction with Wisconsin Highway 22 (WIS 22) and WIS 60 where US 51 heads west a bit with WIS 60 before splitting back north toward Poynette. The route joins I-39 north of Portage. There is a short concurrency with WIS 23 from Endeavor to WIS 82 near Oxford. They stay joined until I-39 ends at WIS 29. Along the way, the route bypasses the small communities of Endeavor, Packwaukee, Westfield, Coloma, Hancock, Plainfield, Plover, and Whiting prior to arriving at Stevens Point. Proceeding north from Stevens Point, the highway bypasses Knowlton, Mosinee, and Rothschild where I-39 terminates at the WIS 29 east interchange. US 51 continues on with WIS 29 for  bypassing Schofield, then proceeding into Wausau where WIS 29 splits to the west. US 51 continues as a freeway to Merrill, passing Brokaw along the way.

The section of US 51 from Portage at its junction with I-39 to Merrill, as well as from County Trunk Highway S (CTH-S) to US 8 in Tomahawk, is built to Interstate Highway standards. In between these freeway segments exists an expressway from Lincoln Drive north of Merrill further north to CTH-S south of Tomahawk with five grade-level intersections. This will eventually be converted to a freeway, making US 51 a continuous freeway from Portage to Tomahawk.

The highway becomes a two-lane road just north of US 8 at the Oneida County line. The highway passes through Minocqua, Manitowish Waters, and Mercer on its northwest trek toward Hurley and its terminus at a junction with US 2 just shy of the Michigan border.

History

Prior to 1926, what is now US 51 was State Trunk Highway 10.

US 51 was upgraded to a full freeway over a period of 25 years from Merrill to Portage. The freeway continues around Portage to the west as I-39 (originally as WIS 78) to connect with I-90 and I-94 while US 51 continues along surface roads into and through Portage. In the 1990s, US 51 was designated as I-39 from its junction with WIS 29 eastbound in Wausau to where it left the freeway at exit 92 in Portage. US 51 remained cosigned with I-39 along this entire stretch of road. Further expansion of the highway northward took place in 2000, when the highway was upgraded to an expressway up to CTH-S. In addition, a super-two freeway from CTH-S to US 8 was upgraded to a four-lane freeway.

The Wisconsin segment of US 51 is designated as the Korean War Veterans Memorial Highway.

Exit list

See also

References

External links

 Wisconsin
51
Transportation in Rock County, Wisconsin
Transportation in Dane County, Wisconsin
Transportation in Columbia County, Wisconsin
Transportation in Marquette County, Wisconsin
Transportation in Waushara County, Wisconsin
Transportation in Portage County, Wisconsin
Transportation in Marathon County, Wisconsin
Transportation in Lincoln County, Wisconsin
Transportation in Oneida County, Wisconsin
Transportation in Vilas County, Wisconsin
Transportation in Iron County, Wisconsin